The Dodge County Courthouse is a historic courthouse building located  in Eastman, Georgia. Built in 1908, it was designed by Eastman-born American architect Edward Columbus Hosford, who is noted for the  courthouses and other buildings that he designed in Florida, Georgia and Texas. The builder was M.L. Lewman & Company. This was the very first courthouse Hosford had ever designed. His commission was controversial because his father, Charlie Columbus Hosford, was a member of the building committee  appointed by the county commissioners. Since Edward C. Hosford then lived in Atlanta, it was rumored that he was going to farm the project out to the more experienced architect who had been bypassed in order to give him the commission, but he moved back to Eastman and did all the work himself.

On September 18, 1980, the building was added to the National Register of Historic Places.

See also
National Register of Historic Places listings in Dodge County, Georgia

References

External links 
 National Register listings for Dodge County
 Carl Vinson Institute of Government listing for Dodge County Courthouse

Courthouses on the National Register of Historic Places in Georgia (U.S. state)
Buildings and structures in Dodge County, Georgia
County courthouses in Georgia (U.S. state)
Edward Columbus Hosford buildings
Neoclassical architecture in Georgia (U.S. state)
National Register of Historic Places in Dodge County, Georgia